Clavariachaete is a genus of fungi in the family Hymenochaetaceae.

Species

Clavariachaete peckoltii
Clavariachaete rubiginosa

Hymenochaetaceae
Agaricomycetes genera